The International Brigades (IB) were volunteer military units of foreigners who fought on the side of the Second Spanish Republic during the Spanish Civil War.  The number of combatant volunteers has been estimated at between 32,000–35,000, though with no more than about 20,000 active at any one time. A further 10,000 people probably participated in non-combatant roles and about 3,000–5,000 foreigners were members of CNT or POUM. They came from a claimed "53 nations" to fight against the Spanish Nationalist forces led by General Francisco Franco and assisted by German and Italian forces.

The volunteers were motivated to fight on political or social grounds and made their way to Spain independently of the Spanish government.  The brigades were not initially formally conceived and methodically recruited. Instead, they evolved as a means of organising the streams of volunteers arriving from every quarter of the world. It has been estimated that up to 25% of IB volunteers were Jewish. This article describes the order of battle of each of the International Brigades, describing the order and manner in which each brigade was mustered and formed, and following the progress of individual battalions throughout the conflict.

Introduction

Early International units
The first volunteers arrived in Spain in mid-August 1936. These were mostly Franco-Belgian, German, British and Italian. At first, they grouped themselves into sections, called Columns or Centuria (nominally of a hundred men). These were mostly formed in August/September 1936.
 The Tom Mann Centuria, named after English trade unionist leader Tom Mann, became part of the Thaelmann Battalion
 The Thaelmann Centuria (the nucleus of the Thaelmann Battalion), named for Ernst Thälmann.
 Gastone Sozzi Centuria, named for Gastone Sozzi
 Rosselli's Italian Column
 Colonna Giustizia e Libertà

Brigade structure

Each brigade was a mixed brigade consisting of four battalions, sometimes with an ancillary specialist support company. They had a brigade commander and a political commissar, and a small brigade staff. Initially, the battalions were formed entirely of foreign volunteers but, increasingly, it became practice to have at least one Spanish battalion in each brigade (and, from spring 1937, one Spanish company in each battalion). As time went on, and the difficulties of recruiting new international volunteers increased, the percentage of Spaniards went up. At first, these were volunteers but conscription was later introduced. The brigades were formally incorporated into the Spanish Army in September 1937, as Spanish Foreign Legion units.

Battalion structure
The battalions were originally organised by language, with volunteers sharing the same (or similar languages) and given names that reflected the groups. To develop an esprit de corps, these names were replaced by names of inspirational figures or events, for example, Garibaldi, or Commune de Paris.

"Theoretically, the Battalion organisation consisted of the Battalion Commander, his Second in Command, the Political Commissar, the Adjutant and orderly room staff, three Companies of infantry, one machine-gun Company, Battalion scouts, and the Quartermaster and cookhouse staff. There were three platoons in each company, each divided into [four] sections of ten men, so that the Battalion at full strength would number more than 500 men...."

Political commissars
See article: Political commissar

International brigade depots

Albacete - Headquarters
Madrigueras - Training camp
Tiflis - Officer training school
Camp Lukácz - Penal battalion

XI International Brigade

Names:
 The Hans Beimler Brigade (after Hans Beimler)
 The Thälmann Brigade (after Ernst Thälmann)

Songs by Ernst Busch and the choir of the XI Brigade:
 Hans Beimler Lied 
 Lied von XI Brigade  ("Song of the XIth Brigade")
 Lied der XI Brigade Or Ballade or Marsch der XI Brigade)

Detailed Order of Battle
 EPR Order of Battle Website 
 Associació Catalana Website

Formation
Formed at Albacete: 14–17 October 1936 as IX Brigada Movil ("Mobile Brigade").
 1st Bn Franco-Belgian (14 October 1936)
 2nd Bn Austro-German (14 October 1936)
 3rd Bn Italo-Spanish (14 October 1936)
 4th Bn Polish-Balkan (17 October 1936)
Re-Organised: 14–22 October 1936 as XI "Hans Beimler" International Brigade. The battalions were renamed as follows:
 Commune de Paris Battalion (after the Paris Commune. (Formerly 1st Franco-Belge)
 Edgar André Battalion (after Edgar André). (Formerly 2nd Austro-German)
 Garibaldi Battalion (after Giuseppe Garibaldi). (Formerly 3rd Italo-Español)
 Dabrowski Battalion (pronounced Dombrowski), (after Jarosław Dąbrowski). (Formerly 4th Polish-Balkan)
Minor Re-Organisation: 3 November 1936
 Garibaldi Battalion, as it had no rifles, was transferred to XII Brigade
 Thaelmann Battalion joined XI Brigade from XII Brigade
 Asturias-Heredia Battalion (Spanish) joined XI Brigade.

Brigade staff

Division "Kléber" (XI and XII Brigade 20 Nov.36 - 4 Feb 37 )
Commander: General "Kléber" (Manfred Stern)

XII International Brigade

Name: The Garibaldi Brigade

Detailed Order of Battle
 EPR Order of Battle Website
 Associació Catalana Website

Formation
Raised 22 October 1936 at Albacete, General "Lukàcs" (Mate Zalka) commanding. (Lukàcs was killed during the Huesca Offensive.)
Units that formed part of the Brigade at different times:
André Marty Battalion
Dabrowski Battalion a.k.a. Dombrowski Battalion
Figlio Battalion
Garibaldi Battalion
Madrid Battalion
Prieto Battalion
Thaelmann Battalion

XIII International Brigade

Names: The Dabrowski Brigade, The Dombrowski Brigade

Detailed Order of Battle
 EPR Order of Battle Website
 Associació Catalana Website

1st formation
Raised: 12 December 1936
 Louise Michel (II) Battalion
 Chapaev Battalion  (Tchapaiev, Czapiaew; named for Vasily Chapayev)
 Vuillemin Battalion
One Balkan Company
1st Battery "Ernst Thaelmann"
2nd Battery "Karl Liebknecht"
3rd Battery "Antoni Gramsci"

2nd formation
Reformed: 4 August 1937
 Dabrowski Battalion
 Palafox Battalion
 Rakosi Battalion

3rd formation
Reformed (in Monredón): 1 October 1938 (exclusively Spanish battalions)

4th formation
Reformed: 23 January 1939 (from demobilised International Brigade members who had remained in Spain)

Brigade staff

XIV International Brigade

Name: The Marseillaise Brigade

Order of Battle
 EPR Order of Battle Website
 Associació Catalana Website

Formation
Raised 20 December 1936 with volunteers mainly from France and Belgium, under General "Walter" (Karol Świerczewski).
After the Battle of Brunete (6–25 July 1937), brigade strength was reduced from four to two battalions. The battalions attached to this Brigade at different times were:
Commune de Paris Battalion
Domingo Germinal Battalion
Henri Barbusse Battalion
Louise Michel I Battalion
Louise Michel II Battalion
Marsellaise Battalion
Pierre Brachet Battalion
Primera Unidad de Avance Battalion
Nine Nations Battalion a.k.a. Sans noms or Des Neuf Nationalités Battalion
Sixth February Battalion
Vaillant-Couturier Battalion

XV International Brigade

Name: The Abraham Lincoln Brigade
Raised: Albacete, 31 January 1937
Brigade songs: Jarama Valley, An tldirnisinta (Internationale), Viva la Quinta Brigada, Ay Carmela (song) (Viva La Quince Brigada)
Battles: Jarama, Brunete, Boadilla, Belchite, Fuentes de Ebro, Teruel, Ebro

Order of Battle

{| class="wikitable"
|-
! Date joined
! Number
! Battalion Name
! Composition
! Date left
! Comments
|-
|align="right" | 31 January 1937
| 16th
| British Battalion
| Irish, Basque, Catalan & British
|align="right" | 23 September 1938
| Demobilised
|-
|align="right" | 31 January 1937
| 17th
| Lincoln Battalion
| US, Canada, Irish, British
|align="right" | 23 September 1938
| Demobilised
|-
|align="right" | 31 January 1937
| 18th
| Dimitrov Battalion
| Balkan
|align="right" | 20 September 1937
| Moved to 45th Div. Reserve
|-
|align="right" | 31 January 1937
| 19th
| Sixth February Battalion
| French & Belgian
|align="right" | 4 August 1937
| Moved to 14th Brigade
|-
|align="right" | 14 March 1937
| 24th
| Volontario 24
| Spanish volunteers
|align="right" | 
| Destroyed in the Ebro Battles
|-
|align="right" | 5 April 1937
| ~
| Español Battalion
| Latin Americans
|align="right" | 23 September 1938
| Demobilised
|-
|align="right" | 29 June 1937
| ~
| Mackenzie-Papineau Battalion
| Canadian & US
|align="right" | 23 September 1938
| Demobilised
|-
|align="right" | 4 July 1937
| 20th
| Washington Battalion
| US
|align="right" | 14 July 1937
| Merged with Lincoln Battalion
|}
Main Sources: (i)  EPR Order of Battle Website, (ii) * Associació Catalana Website

Sub-battalion units attached to Brigade
Connolly Column (Irish volunteers operating as a unit of the Lincoln Battalion)
Brigade Anti-Tank Company
XVth Brigade Photographic Unit (August 1937 – September 1938) Archive
Re-organised May/June 1937, into two regiments:
First regiment, commanded by George Nathan
 Lincoln Bn, commanded by Robert Hale Merriman
 Washington Bn, commanded by Mirko Markovic
 British Bn, commanded by Fred Copeman
Second regiment, commanded by Major "Chapaiev"
 Dimitrov Battalion
 Sixth February Battalion
 Voluntario 24 Battalion (Spanish) (Capitano Aquilla)
Post-Brunete, reinforced by:
 Mackenzie-Papineau Battalion
International Volunteers Demobilised
 Barcelona, 23 September 1938

Other International Brigades

86th Brigade
Raised 13 February 1938
Units that formed part of the Brigade at different times:
Veinte Battalion (Twentieth Battalion)

CXXIX / 129th Brigade

Name/s: Central European Brigade
Raised 13 February 1938
Units that formed part of the Brigade at different times:
Dimitrov Battalion
Djuro Djakovic Battalion (after Đuro Đaković)
Thomas Mazaryk Battalion (after Tomáš Masaryk)
Tschapaiew Battalion

CL / 150th Brigade
Name/s: Dabowski Brigade
Raised 27 May 1937
Units that formed part of the Brigade at different times:
André Marty Battalion (after André Marty)
Mathis Rakosi Battalion (after Mátyás Rákosi)

Ad hoc units
Agrupació Torunczyk (21 January 1939 – 9 February 1939)
Elements from XI, XIII and XV Brigades
Catalonia Offensive

Agrupació Szuster (1 February 1939 – 9 February 1939)
Elements from XII and CXXIX Brigades
Catalonia Offensive

Notes

References 

 Beevor, Antony. (2006). The Battle for Spain: The Spanish Civil War 1936-1939. London: Weidenfeld & Nicolson, 2006. 
 Gurney, Jason (1974) Crusade in Spain. London: Faber, 1974. 
 Thomas, Hugh. (1961) The Spanish Civil War. London: Eyre & Spottiswoode, 1961.
 Thomas, Hugh. (2003) The Spanish Civil War, 2003. London: Penguin (Revised 4th edition), 2003. 
 O'Riordan, Michael. "The Connolly Column", 1979. Reprinted by Warren and Pell, 2005.
 Rust, William (2003). "Britons in Spain", 1939. Reprinted by Warren and Pell, 2003.
 Ryan, Frank (ed.) "The Book of the XV Brigade", 1938. Reprinted by Warren and Pell, 2003.
 Sugarman, Martin. Jews Who Served in The Spanish Civil War PDF file

See also
 Foreign legions

Expatriate military units and formations
Order Of Battle
Spanish Civil War orders of battle